The Haraboti River is a river in the northern part of Bangladesh (commonly known as North Bengal). It passes through Joypurhat District.

References 

Rivers of Bangladesh
Rivers of Rajshahi Division